Center High School is a public, 4-year high school located in Center, Texas and is classified as a 4A school by the University Interscholastic League. It is part of the Center Independent School District and is located in central Shelby County, Texas. In 2015, the school was rated Met Standard.

In 2013, U.S. News & World Report gave Center High School a bronze medal and named the school one of the best high schools in the nation.

History 
Center High School dates back prior to 1900 as "Center School". The earliest graduating class dates back to 1903 with a graduating class of six people.

The original high school building is the current alternative school building, known as Roughrider Academy. The school was built in 1939. The building also caught fire in 1963, but was extinguished.

The current high school building has a new wing specifically designed for career learning opportunities such as culinary, graphic design, business, etc.

Athletics 
The school is home to the Center Roughriders. The team name comes from the Rough Riders, but is spelled without a space.

The Center Roughriders compete in the following sports:

 Football
 Basketball
 Tennis *
 Volleyball
 Golf
 Baseball
 Softball
 Soccer *
 Track and field *
 Powerlifting *
Key: * - has been to state within the past decade.

The current Athletic Director for Center is Coach Ponder. The previous being Barry Bowman.

The Pride of Shelby County 
The Roughrider Band, more commonly known as The Pride of Shelby County, is a band program currently under the direction of Chris Smith and Patrick Conn.

The band also participates in the National Association Of Military Marching Bands|National Association of Military Marching Band (NAMMB) competition where the school competes against other 4A schools to place.

Theater Arts 
The Center High School theater department is active in the UIL One Act Play competition. The director of the theater department is Kearsten Humber.

The theater department also puts on an annual Christmas play as well as a traditional production called "Center Stage". The earliest documented Center play dates back to 1930.

Spirit Organizations 
The school has Varsity and Junior Varsity cheerleading. The mascot, Rowdy the Rough Rider, is typically worn by an upperclassman.

The school's award-winning dance team is known as The Chaparrals.

The Twirlers perform at half-time during the football games before the marching band performs. The twirlers date back as far as 1951.

References

External links 
 http://www.centerisd.org/

High schools in Shelby County, Texas
Public high schools in Texas